Stephanus Andreae, floruit 1571, was a Swedish vicar in Bälinge, Archdiocese of Uppsala, and Member of the Clergy of the Riksdag of the Estates of Sweden.

Stephanus Andreae was the father of Olaus Stephani Bellinus, Christopherus Stephani Bellinus and Johannes Stephani Bellinus.

He participated as Member of the Clergy of the Riksdag of the Estates of Sweden in 1571.

References
 Westerås Stifts Herdaminne by Johan Fredrik Muncktell, First part, http://www.zenker.se/Historia/Herdaminne/irsta.shtml#kh13

16th-century Swedish people
16th-century Lutheran clergy
Members of the Riksdag of the Estates